Circle of Power, also known as Mystique, Brainwash and The Naked Weekend, is a 1981 film, co-produced by Gary Mehlman, Anthony Quinn and Jeffrey White, and based on the non-fiction book The Pit: A Group Encounter Defiled. It stars Yvette Mimieux in one of her final film performances.

Plot
Yvette Mimieux plays Bianca Ray, the chief executive of a giant corporation called "Mystique", but the organization is also known as "Executive Development Training", or EDT.  Christopher Allport plays Jack Nilsson, a decent all-American young executive.

Top management executives are required to spend a weekend with Bianca Ray at a hotel, where they are put under psychological pressure.  As a prerequisite to the training course, participants must sign a waiver giving the company the release to physically and psychologically abuse the individuals in the course.  The participants struggle with their shortcomings, such as obesity and alcoholism.  Another individual is a closet homosexual, and a fourth is a transvestite. At one point in the film, the obese trainee is forced to eat trash and discarded food in front of the other seminar participants.  Eventually, the seminar executives and their wives lose their inhibitions later on in the "consciousness-raising" coursework.

Cast
 Yvette Mimieux as Bianca Ray
 Christopher Allport as Jack Nilsson
 Cindy Pickett as Lyn Nilsson
 John Considine as Jordan Carelli
 Walter Olkewicz as Buddy Gordon
 Leo Rossi as Chris Morris
 Carmen Argenziano as Tony Annese

Reception
The film won a Dramatic Films Award at the 1982 Sundance Film Festival. Circle of Power played under the title Mystique at the 1981 Chicago International Film Festival.

A review in The New York Times described Circle of Power as an "attack on monolithic belief systems," and referred to it as "a worthwhile movie." Roger Ebert of the Chicago Sun-Times gave the film three out of four stars, writing that "...it's an entertaining film with serious intentions."  Ebert compared it to events reported in Boston newspapers about a man who died during a seminar, commenting:  "Art anticipates life." Ebert questioned the conceit of the film, asking the question:  "Could a major corporation get away with this brainwashing?" The authors of the book upon which the film was based concluded their preface by stating:  "And please remember as you read -- it's true."

See also
 Semi-Tough (1977)

References

External links
Reviews
 Review, Stomp Tokyo
 
 

1981 films
American drama films
Films based on non-fiction books
Films directed by Bobby Roth
Films scored by Richard Markowitz
1980s English-language films
1980s American films